Tătărăști is a commune in Bacău County, Western Moldavia, Romania. It is composed of seven villages: Cornii de Jos, Cornii de Sus, Drăgești, Gherdana, Giurgeni, Tătărăști and Ungureni.

References

Communes in Bacău County
Localities in Western Moldavia